is a station of Tokyo Sakura Tram.

Lines
Kōshinzuka Station is served by Tokyo Sakura Tram.

Railway stations in Japan opened in 1977
Railway stations in Tokyo